Transparent Network Substrate (TNS), a proprietary Oracle  computer-networking technology, supports homogeneous peer-to-peer connectivity on top of other networking technologies such as TCP/IP, SDP and named pipes.  TNS operates mainly for connection to Oracle databases.

Protocol 
TNS uses a proprietary protocol. Some details have, however, been reverse engineered.

See also 
Transparency (computing)
Oracle Net Services
Protocol stack

References

External links
 Oracle 8 Architecture and Concepts
 Oracle 9i Architecture of Oracle Net Services

Oracle Corporation
Network protocols
Oracle software